Fruit salad is a food serving made of fruit.

Fruit Salad may also refer to:

 Fruit Salad (confectionery), a raspberry & pineapple flavoured chew
 "Fruit Salad" (song), a 1998 song by the Wiggles
 "Fruit Salad", a song by Tierra Whack from her 2018 album Whack World
 "Fruit Salad", a 2021 song by Tom Cardy

Other uses
 Medal ribbon, a decoration worn on military uniforms referred to colloquially as "fruit salad"